Malcolm Williamson Barrass (15 December 1924 – 4 August 2013) was an English professional footballer.

His father, Matthew, was also a professional footballer. Malcolm W. Barrass was born in Blackpool during his father's spell with the town's club. Malcolm's grandson - also named Matt (born 1980) - was also a professional player.

Career
Barrass started his professional career with Bolton Wanderers in 1944. He won his first England cap on 20 October 1951 when England fought out a 1–1 draw against Wales. His career included an appearance in the now-legendary "Matthews FA Cup Final". 

He became Wigan Athletic's player-manager on 1 August 1958, replacing Trevor Hitchen. He made 20 Lancashire Combination League appearances for the Latics and scored five league goals before resigning on New Year's Day 1959. Jimmy Shirley took over the managerial reins. By 1963 Barrass was trainer at Hyde United.

Personal life
Barrass married his wife, Joyce, on 7 June 1947. The couple had 2 children, Lynne and Robert, and celebrated their diamond anniversary in 2007.

On 5 August 2013, Bolton Wanderers confirmed that Barrass had died at the age of 88.

References

External links
Profile on www.englandstats.com
Profile at TheFootballNetwork

1924 births
2013 deaths
English footballers
England international footballers
England wartime international footballers
Bolton Wanderers F.C. players
Sheffield United F.C. players
Wigan Athletic F.C. players
Wigan Athletic F.C. managers
Nuneaton Borough F.C. players
Sportspeople from Blackpool
Association football defenders
Association football midfielders
English Football League players
Association football utility players
English Football League representative players
Malcolm
English football managers
FA Cup Final players